Carl Brewer (March 8, 1957June 12, 2020) was an American politician who served as the 100th mayor of Wichita, Kansas, and was the city's first elected black mayor. He was elected to the mayoralty in 2007 and reelected in 2011.

He was a member of the Democratic Party and ran for the party's gubernatorial nomination in 2018.

Early life and education

Carl Brewer was born on March 8, 1957, in Wichita, Kansas. In 1975, he graduated from North High School and briefly attended Friends University. He earned a Bachelor of Arts degree in criminal justice from Southern University. From 1977 to 1998, he served in the Kansas Army National Guard and retired as a captain. In 1980, Brewer married Cathy Brewer and the couple had four children.

Career

From 2001 to 2007, Brewer served in the Wichita city council from District 1. In 2004, he ran in a special election to replace state senator Rip Gooch, but was defeated by Donald Betts. In 2007, he was elected mayor of Wichita becoming the city's first elected black mayor, as A. Price Woodard Jr. was selected by the city council to serve as mayor for one term in 1970.

On February 20, 2017, he announced that he would run for the Democratic nomination in Kansas' gubernatorial election and selected Chris Morrow, the mayor of Gardner, Kansas, to run for the lieutenant gubernatorial nomination. However, he was defeated by state senator Laura Kelly. Brewer served on Kelly's transition team after she defeated Republican nominee Kris Kobach in the general election. Kelly appointed him to serve on the Governor's Council on Tax Reform.

In 2019, he and Robert G. Knight appeared in a commercial asking for Lyndy Wells to launch a write-in campaign for the 2019 Wichita mayoral election.

Death

On June 12, 2020, Brewer died in Wichita after a long struggle with an illness. Following his death, the Wichita city council had the city's flags flown at half-staff and Governor Laura Kelly said that "Carl truly embodied all of the best qualities of what it means to be a Kansan, and he will be dearly missed."

Personal life 
Brewer was Catholic, and a member of Wichita's African American Catholic Council.

References

External links
Campaign website
Mayors Against Illegal Guns
Mayor Carl Brewer at City of Wichita official page

1957 births
2020 deaths
African-American mayors in Kansas
African-American people in Kansas politics
Friends University alumni
Kansas city council members
Kansas Democrats
Kansas National Guard personnel
Mayors of Wichita, Kansas
Southern University alumni
African-American Catholics
20th-century African-American people
21st-century African-American people